"Take a Knee, My Ass (I Won't Take a Knee)" is a song recorded by American country music artist Neal McCoy, and was released on November 10, 2017. The song conveys McCoy's self-avowed patriotism, as well as his displeasure towards football players protesting police brutality during the national anthem.

Background
McCoy stated that "Take a Knee, My Ass" was made in response to American football players' kneeling during the national anthem; McCoy found the footballers' actions disrespectful. However, McCoy said that he empathised with their cause. He also intended for the song to "bring people together".

Dan Roberts, who was a fellow country singer and McCoy's friend, wrote the original lyrics of "Take a Knee, My Ass". McCoy claimed to have edited out some lyrics that were more "uncomfortable for me" and "more race-oriented". Before recording the song, McCoy performed it live at a concert in Missouri.

Release and reception

"Take a Knee, My Ass" was released on November 10, 2017, to commercial success; it peaked at no. 4 on Amazon's and iTunes digital country songs charts. It also reached the Top 50 of Billboard'''s Hot Country Songs chart and was described as McCoy's "revival" hit.

However, the song was not favourably received by critics, many of whom criticised McCoy's mischaracterisation of kneeling during the anthem as disrespectful towards the military. Sean Newell of Vice Sports described it as "dumb, disingenuous, and devoid of any redeeming qualities" and derided its rhyme scheme and melody. Rachel Kraus of Mashable called the song "trash", and wrote that "(it) represents the most insidious form of bigotry masked as patriotism. It's simplistic, divisive, and wrong-headed." William Hughes of The A.V. Club'' said of the song, "(it) sounds, to the casual listener, like McCoy is ordering his own buttocks to drop to the ground and pay their ass-y respects."

Chart history

Release history

See also
 Neal McCoy discography

References

External links
 

2017 singles
Songs about the United States
Songs about sportspeople
Protest songs
2017 songs
Neal McCoy songs